Proshyan, is a major village in the Kotayk Province of Armenia.

See also 
Kotayk Province

Notable people 
 Petros Ghevondyan 

 Tigran Hovhannisyan - "Multo Tiko"

References 

World Gazeteer: Armenia – World-Gazetteer.com

Populated places in Kotayk Province
Yazidi populated places in Armenia